Tory Steven James (born May 18, 1973) is a former American football cornerback who played eleven seasons in the National Football League (NFL).

James attended Archbishop Shaw High School before going to college at Louisiana State University, and was drafted by the Denver Broncos in the second round of the 1996 NFL Draft. His career was endangered by a serious knee injury suffered in the first preseason game of the 1997 season. James tore the patellar tendon in his right knee and missed the entire season. The Broncos were the NFL champions of the 1998 season after winning Super Bowl XXXIII against the Atlanta Falcons.

In the 1999 season, after he accumulated 33 tackles and five interceptions, the Broncos made no effort to re-sign James. He then signed with the Oakland Raiders as an unrestricted free agent, signing a five-year, $18 million contract.  However, after the 2002 season, the Raiders (after eight interceptions in three years) left James unprotected again, and he signed a four-year, $14 million contract with the Cincinnati Bengals.

On January 6, 2001, during the Raiders' divisional playoff game against the Miami Dolphins, James made a 90-yard interception return for a touchdown, and the Raiders beat the Dolphins, 27–0, in Oakland.

2004 proved to be James' best professional season, as he intercepted eight passes, notched 56 tackles, and forced two fumbles.  He was voted onto the AFC Pro Bowl squad.

On February 9, 2007, Bengals coach Marvin Lewis indicated that James will not be resigned.  He was signed by the New England Patriots on April 17, 2007.  James was cut by the Patriots on September 9, 2007.

References

External links 
 ''Tory James - New England Patriot's Profile'

1973 births
Living people
American football cornerbacks
Archbishop Shaw High School alumni
LSU Tigers football players
Denver Broncos players
Oakland Raiders players
Cincinnati Bengals players
New England Patriots players
American Conference Pro Bowl players
Players of American football from New Orleans